The Outside Agency is a Dutch hardcore techno duo composed of DJ/producers Noël Wessels (also known by the stage name DJ Hidden) and Frank Nitzinsky (also known by the stage name Eye-D). The pair operate out of two studios based in Goes, Netherlands. They also run two record labels: Genosha Recordings and its sister label Genosha One Seven Five.

History
Wessels and Nitzinsky were introduced to each other by mutual friends in late 1991. Until that time they both thought that they were alone in the production of hardcore music in their city. Shortly after being introduced, the two started working together and formed a group called X-Factor. In 1996, after several years of sending out demos, they landed their first record deal with Coolman Records. The same demo they sent to Coolman Records was also picked up by several weeks later by Mokum Records and also resulted in a signing. The duo came up with the name 'The Outside Agency' for Mokum Records as the X-Factor project was signed to Coolman Records exclusively.

Starting 1998 hardcore underwent many changes that caused The Outside Agency to no longer feel at home in the genre and they moved their focus to their drum & bass careers as DJ Hidden and Eye-D. Some years later the two released the slower tempo material they'd been producing in the meantime on Black Monolith Records and Otaku Records. These were noticed by Patrick van Kerckhoven, who offered the two a chance to run their own label under his Cardiac Music umbrella company in 2003. The label they started, Genosha Recordings, quickly grew into one of the most successful, influential and respected 'experimental industrial' hardcore labels in the hardcore music scene.

Music style

The Outside Agency's musical style is not easily characterized, as they produce a wide variety of hardcore that draws influences from several other genres. They also produce their music at extremely varied tempos, ranging from 110 to 280 BPM. The only elements that are utilized consistently are the dark, brooding atmospheres that both artists add to their music.

Although they have collaborated on several tracks, the bulk of their output is produced by an individual member of the group.

One of the styles that the two have gained particular notice for is 'crossbreed', because they wanted to see if they could influence other people to start using it. The two had always used drum & bass influences in both their own hardcore productions as well as their DJ sets, but the later releases on Genosha Recordings and some of their guest-releases on other labels had grown beyond mere influence. The tracks had turned into full hybrids of hardcore and drum & bass. Nitzinsky and Wessels decided to take it to the next level by giving this new style a name: crossbreed; and they started a sister label to Genosha Recordings with the specific purpose to release crossbreed music: Genosha One Seven Five. This was the first label of its kind and its releases were successfully picked up by both drum & bass and hardcore DJs. Crossbreed is now widely accepted as a genre and other labels and producers active in the genre have surfaced.

Despite crossbreed's popularity, The Outside Agency have not confined themselves to producing it. This is evidenced by their 2012 album The Dogs Are Listening on the German Ad Noiseam label, which only features two tracks that could be described as crossbreed and sees the duo touching on all styles and tempos they have produced in the past as well as new ones.

DJ performances
The Outside Agency regularly performs DJ sets at music events all over the world. They have in the past performed at reputable events such as Thunderdome, Decibel, Defqon.1, Q-Base, Therapy Sessions, Club r_AW and Mystery Land.

Their DJ sets are largely composed of their own material, although they also play some music from other artists.

Discography
The following is a list of releases by The Outside Agency.

Singles & EPs
 1996: The Outside Agency EP on Mokum Records
 1997: The Case of the Black Bubbles on Mokum Records
 1998: We Are As Fresh As Ice Is Cold on Mokum Records
 2001: In Theory Everything Is Straight on Black Monolith Records
 2003: The Art of Penetrating Without Penetrating on Black Monolith Records
 2003: The Coconut Revolution on Otaku Records
 2003: There Can Be Only None on Genosha Recordings
 2003: Goes Noord vs. The Rest of the World on Genosha Recordings
 2004: Weapons of Ass Destruction vol. 3 on Genosha Recordings
 2005: Flip-Flops in the Mosh Pit on Genosha Recordings
 2005: Hostile Place (/w Celsius) on Epileptik Productions
 2005: Screaming Phoenix VIP on Enzyme VIP
 2005: Scenocide 101 Album Sampler with Awesome Title on Genosha Recordings
 2005: Motherfucking Ants on Genosha Recordings
 2005: Necropsych on 46 Records
 2005: War in the 8th Dimension on Genosha Recordings
 2006: 10 Inches of What? on Genosha Recordings
 2006: The Neutralizing Agent on Provoke Records
 2006: No, We Don’t Want You to Clap Your Fucking Hands on Genosha Recordings
 2006: Brainpainter on Meta4 Recordings
 2007: Our Fear on Aentitainment
 2007: The Way of the Exploding Fist on Hong Kong Violence
 2007: The Easy Money Remix EP on Genosha Recordings
 2007: Return of the Revenge of the Dark Alley Space Vampires on Genosha Recordings
 2007: Forever Is a Long Time Coming on Genosha Recordings
 2008: Goes Noord vs The Rest of the World II on Genosha Recordings
 2008: Un Titre En Francais Intensement Profond Et Compliqué Que Vous Ne Comprendrez Jamais on B2K Records
 2009: Reality Collapse/Hell's Basement on Independenza Records
 2009: The Quadrilogy EP on NGM Records
 2009: Surreal / Chaos Theory on Genosha One Seven Five
 2009: Return to the Point of No Return on Symp.TOM
 2009: Scandinavian Chess on TNI
 2010: Crossbreed Definition Series part 1 (/w Cooh and SPL) on Genosha One Seven Five 
 2010: Hardcore Beyond the Bone on Genosha Recordings
 2010: Crossbreed Definition Series part 2 (/w Counterstrike and Donny) on Genosha One Seven Five
 2010: The Solution / Wait Your Turn on Killing Sheep
 2010: Crossbreed Definition Series part 3 (/w Current Value and Switch Technique) on Genosha One Seven Five
 2010: Choice Mission on Meta4 Recordings
 2010: The Flux Capacitor / Destruction on Smackdown Recordings
 2011: Undermind / Pacifists (/w Sei2ure) on Genosha One Seven Five
 2011: Primitive / Scintillate (/w DJ Hidden) on Sustained Records
 2011: Unmade World on TNI
 2011: Cross on Nekrolog1k Recordings
 2011: The Moment on Union Recordings
 2012: Favorite Sin / This Never Happened (/w Peter Kurten & Katharsys and Forbidden Society) on Genosha One Seven Five
 2012: The Price Is Right / Ghetto Blast on PRSPCT XTRM
 2012: The Disputed Kings of Industrial (w/ Ophidian) on Genosha Recordings
 2012: Headphone Wisdom / Don't Fear the Darkness (w/ DJ Hidden) on Union Recordings
 2012: Perfect Organism (w/ Sinister Souls) on PRSPCT Recordings
 2013: Einstein / Tesla (w/ DJ Hidden) on Future Sickness Records
 2013: Goes Noord Vs The Rest Of The World III (w/ Fracture 4, Broken Rules, Dep Affect and Sei2ure) on Genosha Recordings
 2014: Now This Is Crossbreed Vol. 10 on Genosha One Seven Five
 2015: Prepare to Die / Borrowed Time on Genosha One Seven Five
 2015: Der Remaken on Genosha Recordings
 2015: Just Noise / My Design on Genosha One Seven Five
 2015: The Future Is No on Genosha Recordings
 2015: Bloed, Zweet & Snaren on Genosha One Seven Five
 2015: The Easy Money Remix EP 2: More Easy Money on Genosha Recordings
 2016: The Easy Money Remix EP 3: The Most Easy Money on Genosha Recordings
 2016: Cause An Effect on Genosha One Seven Five
 2017: Blue Stories on Heresy Recordings

Albums
 2005: Scenocide 101 (2xCD) on Genosha Recordings
 2010: Scenocide 202 (2xCD) on Genosha Recordings
 2012: The Dogs Are Listening (CD+G) on Ad Noiseam
 2017: Scenocide 404 (2xCD) on Genosha Recordings

References

External links
 
 
 
 
 The Outside Agency on Beatport

Club DJs
Dutch DJs
Dutch record producers
Hardcore techno musicians
Dutch musical duos
Electronic music duos
Musical groups established in 1991
The Outside Agency
The Outside Agency
1991 establishments in the Netherlands
Electronic dance music DJs